The Sichuan Basin evergreen broadleaf forests are a critically endangered WWF ecoregion. The broadleaf forest habitat once covered the Sichuan Basin, but today is limited to mountains and preserved temple grounds in the basin and around the basin's rim. An especially well-preserved example of remaining forest exists on Mount Emei at the western edge of the Sichuan Basin. The original forests are thought to have been made up of subtropical oaks, laurels, and Schima. Much of the remaining Sichuan Basin has been converted to anthropogenic agricultural use in the last 5,000 years.

Fauna
Endangered and critically endangered animal species that have traditionally inhabited the Sichuan Basin evergreen broadleaf forests include:

Amphibians
 Boulenger's paa frog
 Chinese giant salamander
 Chinting lazy toad
 Omei lazy toad

Birds
 Baer's pochard
 Far Eastern curlew
 Oriental stork
 Scaly-sided merganser
 Sichuan partridge
 Silver oriole
 Yellow-breasted bunting

Mammals
 Chinese forest musk deer
 Chinese pangolin
 Dhole
 Red panda

References

Palearctic ecoregions
Ecoregions of China
Temperate broadleaf and mixed forests